Stade Francis Le Basser is a multi-use stadium in Laval, France. It is currently used mostly for football matches and is the home stadium of Stade Lavallois. The stadium is able to hold 18,739 people.

References

Francis Le Basser
Francis Le Basser
Sports venues in Mayenne
Sports venues completed in 1971